Louis William Marcus (May 18, 1863 – August 18, 1923) was a Jewish-American lawyer and judge from Buffalo, New York.

Life 
Marcus was born on May 18, 1863 in Buffalo, New York, the son of Leopold and Amelia Marcus.

Marcus attended public school and Williams Academy. He then went to Cornell Law School, graduating from there with an LL.B. in 1889. He was admitted to the bar when he was twenty five, and in 1890 he helped form the law firm Swift, Weaver & Marcus. When Swift withdrew from the firm in 1892, it continued under the name Weaver & Marcus. The firm ended with Weaver's death in 1894.

In 1895, Marcus was elected judge of the Surrogate's Court of Erie County as a Republican. He was re-elected judge in 1901. In 1905, Governor Frank W. Higgins appointed him Justice of the New York Supreme Court to succeed the retiring Edward W. Hatch. He was elected to the position in 1906, and in 1920 he was re-elected for a fourteen-year term. He served as Justice until his death.

Marcus was a member of Delta Kappa Epsilon, the Freemasons, the Shriners, the Buffalo Club, and the Country Club. In 1889, he married Ray H. Dahlman. Following Ray's death in 1917, he lived with his sister Rosalind C. Marcus.

Marcus died from a year's long illness on August 18, 1923. He was buried in Forest Lawn Cemetery.

References

External links 

 The Political Graveyard
1863 births
1923 deaths
Lawyers from Buffalo, New York
Cornell Law School alumni
19th-century American Jews
20th-century American Jews
Jewish American attorneys
19th-century American judges
20th-century American judges
New York (state) Republicans
New York Supreme Court Justices
Burials at Forest Lawn Cemetery (Buffalo)